Sir Roger North (18 February 1577 – 17 June 1651) was an English politician who sat in the House of Commons  at various times between 1621 and 1648.

North was the son of Sir Henry North of Mildenhall, Suffolk and his wife, Mary Knevit, daughter of Richard Knevit. He was knighted on 16 June 1618.
 
In 1621, North was elected Member of Parliament for Eye. He was then elected MP for Suffolk in 1624. In 1625, he was re-elected for Eye and retained the seat in the 1626 and 1628 elections. He sat until 1629 when King Charles decided to rule without parliament for eleven years. 
 
In April 1640, North was re-elected MP for Eye in the Short Parliament. He was re-elected MP for Eye in the Long Parliament in November 1640 and sat until 1648 when he was excluded under Pride's Purge. North died at the age of 74 on 
17 June 1651.

Marriages
North married, firstly, Elizabeth Gilbert, daughter of Sir John Gilbert of Great Finborough, Suffolk and had two sons and a daughter. Elizabeth died on 29 November 1612. He married, secondly, Thomasine, daughter of Thomas Clence of Holbrook. His son, Henry, succeeded him and became a Baronet.

References

 

  

1577 births
1651 deaths
People from Eye, Suffolk
Knights Bachelor
English MPs 1621–1622
English MPs 1624–1625
English MPs 1625
English MPs 1626
English MPs 1628–1629
English MPs 1640 (April)
English MPs 1640–1648